Glenn Graham (born April 29, 1974) is a Canadian musician, composer, author, and academic from Judique, Cape Breton Island, Nova Scotia.

Music career
Graham has received music industry recognition. His second solo release, "Step Outside", garnered nominations for "Male Artist of the Year" and "Roots/Traditional Solo Recording of the Year" at the 2002 ECMAs. In 2006 he received his fifth nomination at the ECMAs for his recording, "Drive", in the Roots/Traditional Solo Recording category. In 2006, he authored The Cape Breton Fiddle, published by the Cape Breton University Press. He and first cousin, the Honourable Rodney MacDonald (an educator and retired politician who served as the 26th Premier of Nova Scotia from 2006–09 and as MLA for the riding of Inverness in the Nova Scotia House of Assembly from 1999 to 2009), formed their own label, GlennRod Music Incorporated. Their 1997 album "Traditionally Rockin'" was nominated for two ECMAs. After MacDonald entered politics, Graham created and recorded on his own label, Bowbeat, but later returned to recording, performing, and marketing independently under his own name. He remains in demand for performances, both solo and as a duo act with MacDonald. Graham's sister, Amy, is also a Cape Breton musician and songwriter who has received radio airplay and music placements on TV shows.

Discography
 Let 'Er Rip (1996)
 Traditionally Rockin (1997, with Rodney MacDonald)
 Step Outside (2000)
 Cape Breton Fiddle and Piano Music (Smithsonian, 2004, with The Beaton Family of Mabou)
 Drive (2005)
 Decade: A Compilation (2007)

Family and Other Musical Accomplishments
Graham's parents are Gaelic singer Daniel ("Danny" Danny Graham) and pianist Mary (Beaton) Graham. He began performing in public at age seven, when he sang a Gaelic song with his father in a concert in Glendale, Nova Scotia. He began taking fiddle lessons at age ten from his maternal uncle, Kinnon Beaton, a renowned Cape Breton fiddler and prolific composer. Graham's grandfather, Donald Angus Beaton, was a legendary fiddler/composer, and his grandmother, Elizabeth Beaton, was a well-known pianist. Graham and musicians from his mother's side of the family, the Beatons, have been recorded by Smithsonian Folkways Recordings.  He is also a grand-nephew of the late Alex Francis MacKay, a revered native Gaelic-speaking Cape Breton fiddler. Moreover, Graham is a song-writer and composer. He released a book containing some of his hundreds of fiddle tunes; other artists have recorded some of his compositions while popular TV series and independent films have also featured his music.

Education and Related Accomplishments
Graham studied political science at St. Francis Xavier University in Antigonish (BA Honours), and obtained his first post-graduate degree (Master of Arts) in Atlantic Canada Studies at Saint Mary's University, Halifax in 2004, with his thesis, Cape Breton Fiddle Music: The Making and Maintenance of a Tradition. A revised and widely-cited book version was published in 2006 as "The Cape Breton Fiddle: Making and Maintaining Tradition" with CBU Press and is now with Nimbus Publishing. Graham also earned a PhD in Political Science at Dalhousie University, taught courses there, and taught as an Assistant Professor in Political Science at Saint Francis Xavier University. Graham currently works as an Assistant Professor at Cape Breton University. He has published articles in academic journals such as the Journal of Canadian Studies and Canadian Political Science Review and was a member of Nova Scotia's 2018-19 Electoral Boundaries Commission.

References

External links
 Performance at Cape Breton Live Radio
 Celtic Colours, Biography

1974 births
Living people
Writers from Nova Scotia
Musicians from Nova Scotia
People from Inverness County, Nova Scotia
Canadian people of Scottish descent
Cape Breton fiddlers
Canadian male violinists and fiddlers
St. Francis Xavier University alumni
Saint Mary's University (Halifax) alumni
21st-century Canadian violinists and fiddlers
21st-century Canadian male musicians